Tone River or River Tone may refer to:
 Tone River, a river of Japan
 River Tone, a river of England
 Tone River (Western Australia)
 Tone River (New Zealand)